Battle of Ostrołęka may refer to:
 Battle of Ostrołęka (1807), between First French Empire force and Russian forces
 Battle of Ostrołęka (1831), during Poland's November Uprising
 Battle of Ostrołęka (1920), during the Polish-Soviet War